Cyberia is a 1995 album by UK-based industrial band Cubanate. The album features one of the band's most well known songs, "Oxyacetylene", which was also included alongside "Skeletal", "Industry" and "Autonomy" (from the Antimatter album) in instrumental versions in the video game Gran Turismo.

Track listing

UK release 
 "Cyberia" – 1:16
 "Oxyacetylene" – 4:02
 "Hatesong" – 4:44
 "Build" – 4:47
 "Transit" – 5:44
 "Skeletal" – 4:21
 "Human Drum" – 7:03
 "Das Island" – 2:05
 "Industry" – 4:42
 "False Dawn" – 7:14
 "Hatesong (Extended)" – 6:01
 "Oxyacetylene (Extended)" – 6:18

U.S. release 
 "Cyberia" – 1:16
 "Oxyacetylene" – 4:02
 "Hatesong" – 4:44
 "Build" – 4:47
 "Transit" – 5:43
 "Skeletal" – 4:21
 "Human Drum" – 7:03
 "Das Island" – 2:05
 "Industry" – 4:47
 "Hatesong (Extended)" – 6:01
 "Oxyacetylene (Extended)" – 6:20
 "Oxyacetylene (Extended Remix)" – 6:54
 "Skeletal (Remix)" – 4:27
 "Body Burn (Julian Beeston Mix Extended)" – 4:59

References

1994 albums
Cubanate albums